Steventon Island is a broad ice-covered island about  long off of Antarctica, lying west of Court Ridge in the Sulzberger Ice Shelf. It was mapped from surveys by the United States Geological Survey (USGS) and U.S. Navy air photos (1959–65), and named by the Advisory Committee on Antarctic Names (US-ACAN) for Richard F. Steventon, USN, Petty Officer in charge of Eights Station, 1963.

Islands of Marie Byrd Land